Ching Giap See Temple is located along Jalan Sulaiman in Muar and it is the largest Buddhist temple in the State of Johor, Malaysia. This Buddhist temple is considered as the Buddhist landmark in southern Malaysia region, as compared to Penang's Kek Lok Si Temple in Northern Malaysia region. It was first built on 23 June 1946, rebuilt in 1969 and expanded in 1982. It covers an area of about one acre.

See also
 Buddhism in Malaysia
 Kek Lok Si Temple, Penang
 Xiang Lin Si Temple, Malacca
 Pu Tuo Si Temple, Kota Kinabalu, Sabah
 Puu Jih Shih Temple, Sandakan, Sabah

References

Religious buildings and structures completed in 1945
Buddhist temples in Malaysia
Religious buildings and structures in Johor
Tourist attractions in Johor
20th-century Buddhist temples
Muar District
20th-century architecture in Malaysia